The Universe Championships are annual worldwide bodybuilding events organised by the National Amateur Body-Builders' Association (NABBA). Originally promoted as the  contest, the event was expanded to include women's classes in 1968. Notable previous winners include bodybuilder, actor, and former governor of California Arnold Schwarzenegger, and bodybuilder and actor Steve Reeves (1926–2000).

The Universe Championships includes the following classes:

History

In 1948 David Johnston, then editor of Strength and Health magazine, and his team organised the Mr. Universe contest in London to coincide with the Olympic Games. The event drew great attention from bodybuilders and the general public who packed the Scala Theatre to see the spectacle. John Grimek earned the inaugural title with Steve Reeves placing second. Reeves eventually found his way to the microphone to declare, "I think that John Grimek is the greatest bodybuilder who ever lived!"

While there was no contest held in 1949, behind the scenes, members of the Strength and Health League were arranging the formation of the National Amateur Body-Builders' Association or NABBA. NABBA announced that it would be hosting the Mr Universe contest again in 1950. Steve Reeves returned to England to be crowned champion that year. Despite being the first NABBA Mr Universe, Steve Reeves was not chosen as the silhouette for the NABBA logo. That distinction would go to John Grimek and his likeness is still used to this day as the emblem of the association.

When Oscar Heidenstam became the NABBA Secretary in 1955, after a highly successful competitive career, he quickly became the main driving force of not only NABBA but also the Mr Universe contest. Around the same time, a network of area shows in the UK was established to increase membership.

In 1957, the Guadeloupan-French bodybuilder Arthur Robin became the first Black man to win the Mr Universe title.

The early success of the Mr Universe was underpinned by the support of many of the big names taking part such as John Grimek, Steve Reeves, Reg Park and Bill Pearl. Into the 1960s and 1970s the Mr Universe also became the launching pad for many of the famous bodybuilders of the day such as Arnold Schwarzenegger, Lou Ferrigno, Serge Nubret and many others.

These were the most influential champions, who not only took part, but encouraged others in America and Europe to support the Universe. Their inspiration still encourages many young bodybuilders today.

While the contest was initially only for amateur male bodybuilders, a professional class was added in 1952. The NABBA UK Constitution traditionally defines an amateur as someone who has "never entered and accepted prize money in an advertised professional event." Today NABBA International, the worldwide governing body, offers Pro Cards to the four male height class winners at the Universe Championships and the NABBA World Championships. Between 2011 and 2013 there was no professional Mr. Universe class held as interest had diminished. In 2013 however, following a seven-year absence from competition, Lee Priest returned and won the overall title as an amateur. Following his victory, the NABBA International Council determined that in 2014 the NABBA Professional Division would be reestablished with the inaugural professional contest being the 2014 NABBA World Championships in Belfast, Northern Ireland. In 2014, Dave Titterton won the Professional Mr Universe title in Southport, England.

Women's bodybuilding classes were included from 1968 as Ms Physique and then divided in 1986 into Ms Physique and Ms Figure. The Ms Physique class has since been discontinued at the Universe Championships however a Ms Toned and Ms. Athletic Figure is now offered.

In 1985, a Junior Mr Universe class was included for men under 21 years. The class was discontinued between 1990 and 1999 but returned in 2000.

In 1991, a Masters Over 40 class was introduced. The inaugural winner was Graeme Lancefield from Australia, narrowly beating NABBA legend John Citrone for the title. A Masters Over 50 class was introduced in 2002 with Mr Universe veteran Ian Lawrence from Scotland capturing the new award.

The NABBA Universe Championships is conducted under the auspices of NABBA UK and its chairman Jim Charles.

A separate competition called IFBB Mr. Universe was organized by the IFBB however his changed its name to the World Amateur Bodybuilding Championships in 1976.

Judging

The athletes are judged on their symmetry, proportions and the size and clarity of each muscle group. Most of the judging occurs during the day (this is called the pre-judging) before the distractions of the evening show, the finals.

Winners

References

External links 
 Full Winners List at NABBA
 Complete Results - Amateur Men
 Complete Results - Amateur Women
 Complete Results - Pro Men
 www.nabba.co.uk
 www.nabba-international.com/

Bodybuilding competitions
Recurring events established in 1948
1948 establishments in England